Cyrtarachne perspicillata is a species of spider of the genus Cyrtarachne. It is found in Sri Lanka, Sumatra, Java, and New Guinea. The subspecies Cyrtarachne perspicillata possoica Merian, 1911 is found in Sulawesi.

See also 
 List of Araneidae species

References

Araneidae
Spiders of Asia
Spiders described in 1859
Taxa named by Carl Ludwig Doleschall